Sydney Ionoval Jones (23 May 1894 – 28 April 1982) was a New Zealand politician of the National Party.

Early life
He received his education from Hastings High School, Napier Boys' High School, Wellington Teachers' Training College, and Victoria University College. Prior to finishing his tertiary education, he enrolled with the Samoan Expeditionary Force in 1914. Between 1916 and 1919, he went with the New Zealand Expeditionary Force (NZEF) to France, Belgium, and Germany. He completed his studies after the war and graduated from Victoria with an MA (Hons) in economics.

Jones then went teaching, first at Marlborough College and then at Hastings High School, where he became first assistant. In Hastings, he was president of the Old Boys Football Club and the local Returned Services' Association (RSA).

Political career

Jones died in 1982, and was buried at Hastings Cemetery.

Notes

References

1894 births
1982 deaths
New Zealand National Party MPs
People educated at Napier Boys' High School
New Zealand military personnel of World War I
Victoria University of Wellington alumni
People from Hastings, New Zealand
People educated at Hastings Boys' High School
Members of the New Zealand House of Representatives
New Zealand MPs for North Island electorates
Unsuccessful candidates in the 1954 New Zealand general election
Burials at Hastings Cemetery, New Zealand